Sophie Henschel (1841–1916) was a German industrialist.  She was married to Oscar Henschel and the leader of Henschel & Son from his death in 1894 until 1910. She was one of the richest women in Germany. She was known as a patron of the arts and was given the Wilhelm-Orden.

References

1841 births
1916 deaths
19th-century German businesswomen
19th-century German businesspeople
20th-century German businesswomen
20th-century German businesspeople
German industrialists